KIF Kolding is a handball club based in Kolding, Denmark who competes in the Danish Handball League. KIF Kolding has won the Danish Handball Championship a record 14 times.

History

KIF Kolding
KIF Kolding won its first Danish Handball Championship in 1987. From 1987 to 2009 KIF won the Danish Handball Championship 12 times. In the summer of 2011 the women team of the club became an independent club called Vejen EH.

KIF Kolding København
KIF Kolding København was formed in August 2012 after AG København went bankrupt. Some of the players from AG København joined the players from KIF and some of AGK's sponsors also joined KIF under the new name. KIF Kolding København played some home games in Kolding and some in Brøndby. KIF won the Danish Handball Championship 2 times under the name KIF Kolding København.

KIF Kolding
On 31 March 2018 KIF announced in a press release, that the club will drop the Copenhagen part of the club and will again be known as KIF Kolding. A new board was established and long time director Jens Boessen stepped down. 9 million DKK was invested into the club and old creditors written off debt of 11 million DKK.

Honours
Danish Handball League: 14 (record)
:1986–87, 1987–88, 1989–90, 1990–91, 1992–93, 1993–94, 2000–01, 2001–02, 2002–03, 2004–05, 2005–06, 2008–09, 2013–14, 2014–15
Danish Handball Cup: 8
:1989–90, 1993–94, 1998–99, 2001–02, 2004–05, 2006–07, 2007–08, 2012–13
 Double
 Winners (4): 1989–90, 1993–94, 2001–02, 2004–05

Team

Current squad
Squad for the 2022-23 season

Goalkeeper
 1  Magnus Brandbyge
 12  Tim Winkler
 20  Rasmus Døssing
Wingers
LW
 14  Bjarke Christensen
 28  Nicolai Snogdal

RW
 21  Peter Torpegaard Lund
 29  Viktor Nevers

Line players
 4  Anders Beuschau
 5  Steven Plucnar Jacobsen
 18  Benjamin Pedersen

Back players
LB
 10  Vetle Rønningen
 11  Andreas Elbæk
 17  Erik Thorsteinsen Toft
 19  Thomas Boilesen

CB
 7  Sander Øverjordet
 15  Jens Svane Peschardt (c)
 22  Albert Thanning

RB
 2  Mads Peter Lønborg
 27  Jesper Meinby

Out on loan
  Emil Jessen (LB) (at  Bjerringbro-Silkeborg Håndbold until summer 2023)

Transfers
Transfers for the 2023-24 season

Joining
  Frederik Bay (LW) (from  GOG Håndbold)
  Oliver Norlyk (RB) (from  Skjern Håndbold)
  Martin Risom (RB) (from  TMS Ringsted)

Leaving
  Tim Winkler (GK) (to  Skjern Håndbold)
  Nicolai Snogdal (LW) (to  TM Tønder)
  Mads Peter Lønborg (RB) (to  HC Erlangen)

Transfers for the 2024-25 season

Joining

Leaving
  Bjarke Christensen (LW) (to  Skjern Håndbold)
  Vetle Rønningen (LB) (to  Skjern Håndbold)
  Sander Øverjordet (CB) (to  Haslum HK)

Staff

Notable former players
Men

 Bo Spellerberg
 Boris Schnuchel
 Christian Hjermind
 Claus Flensborg
 Henrik Møllgaard
 Jesper Nøddesbo
 Joachim Boldsen
 Kasper Hvidt
 Lars Christiansen
 Lars Krogh Jeppesen
 Lars T. Jørgensen
 Lasse Andersson
 Lasse Boesen
 Magnus Landin Jacobsen
 Rene Toft Hansen
 Torsten Laen
 Albert Rocas
 Mateo Garralda
 Niko Mindegía
 Antonio García Robledo
 Fábio Chiuffa
 Bilal Šuman 
 Muhamed Toromanović
 Ratko Nikolić
 Konstantin Igropulo
 Ole Erevik (2008-2011)
 Petter Øverby
 Fredrik Ohlander
 Kim Andersson
 Philip Stenmalm
 Ólafur Stefánsson

Notable former coaches

 Bilal Šuman 
 Aron Kristjánsson
 Antonio Carlos Ortega

References

External links
Official website

Danish handball clubs
Kolding
Handball clubs established in 1941
1941 establishments in Denmark